Woodlawn Farm may refer to:

Woodlawn Farm (Jacksonville, Illinois), listed on the NRHP in Illinois
Woodlawn Farm (Slate Hill, New York), listed on the NRHP in New York
Woodlawn Farm (Washington Courthouse, Ohio), listed on the NRHP in Ohio